Mashta al-Helu (also known as Meshta al-Helu or Mashta al-Helo) is a town and resort in northwestern Syria, administratively part of the Tartus Governorate, located 35 kilometers east of Tartus. The village is located in a green wooded area amid the An-Nusayriyah Mountains, the Syrian coastal mountain range. Nearby localities include Kafrun to the west, al-Malloua and al-Bariqiyah to the southwest, Habnamrah and Marmarita to the south, Hadiya to the southeast, Kafr Ram to the east, Ayn Halaqim to the northeast, Ayn al-Shams to the north and Duraykish to the northwest.

According to the Syria Central Bureau of Statistics (CBS), Mashta al-Helu had a population of 2,458 in the 2004 census. It is the administrative center of the Mashta al-Helu nahiyah ("sub-district") of the Safita District which contained 19 localities with a collective population of 12,577 in 2004. Its inhabitants are predominantly Christians.

The town has an elevation of 465 meters above sea level. Prior to the Baathist takeover of the country in the 1960s, Mashta al-Helu was one of a few villages in the coastal mountain region that was electrified and connected to a grid.

References

Populated places in Safita District
Towns in Syria
Eastern Orthodox Christian communities in Syria